Myriophyllum sibiricum is a species of water milfoil known by the common names shortspike watermilfoil, northern watermilfoil, and Siberian water-milfoil. It is native to Russia, China, and much of North America, where it grows in aquatic habitat such as ponds and streams. It generally grows over a meter long, its green stem drying white. It is lined with whorls of fanlike green leaves divided into many narrow, feathery lobes.

Description

References

External links
 Jepson Manual Treatment
 Photo gallery

sibiricum
Freshwater plants
Flora of North America
Flora of Asia